The Grand prix des lectrices de Elle is a French literary prize awarded by readers of Elle magazine.

History
Unlike other literary prizes that have professionals for their juries and selection committees, the Grand prix des lectrices de Elle is a public award, convened and selected by readers of the magazine, and aimed at giving a voice to women who love to read. At its inception in 1969 by Hélène Lazareff, it was awarded solely to novels. From 1977, two categories were recognised - literary fiction and non-fiction. From 2002, crime fiction also came to be awarded.

Until 1992, eight regional committees designated at the first instance books of the month. A national jury then took over to elect the two major prizewinners in the categories of novels and non-fiction. Currently, eight monthly juries of fifteen readers each form the grand jury of 120 readers.

The editor of the Elle magazine makes an initial selection of books, emphasising first works or young authors or new publishers, and systematically eliminating the works that have already won major literary awards such as the Prix Goncourt, Prix Femina or the Prix Médicis. After this, every month from September to April, the eight juries of fifteen readers of Elle magazine deliberate to select their finalists, which in turn will be read by all the juries to select the grand winner in May.

Novels (from 1970) 
 1970: Arlette Grebel,  Ce soir, Tania... - Éditions Gallimard
 1971: Michèle Perrein,  La Chineuse - Éditions Julliard
 1972: Elvire de Brissac,  Un long mois de septembre - Éditions Grasset
 1973: Simone Schwarz-Bart,  Pluie et vent sur Télumée Miracle - Éditions du Seuil
 1974: Max Gallo,  Un pas vers la mer - Éditions Robert Laffont
 1975: Françoise Lefèvre,  La Première Habitude - Jean-Jacques Pauvert
 1976: Roger Boussinot,  Vie et mort de Jean Chalosse - Robert Laffont
 1977: Guyette Lyr,  La Fuite en douce - Mercure de France
 1978: Hortense Dufour,  La Marie-Marraine - Grasset
 1979: Jeanne Bourin,  La Chambre des dames - La Table Ronde
 1980: Marie-Thérèse Humbert,  À l'autre bout de moi - Stock
 1981: José-André Lacour,  Le Rire de Caïn - La Table Ronde
 1982: Clarisse Nicoïdski,  Couvre-Feux - Ramsay
 1983: Paul Savatier,  Le Photographe - Gallimard
 1984: Michel Ragon,  Les Mouchoirs rouges de Cholet - Albin Michel
 1985: Frédéric Rey,  La Haute Saison - Flammarion
 1986: François-Marie Banier,  Balthazar, fils de famille - Gallimard
 1987: Jack-Alain Léger,  Wanderweg - Gallimard
 1988: Kenizé Mourad,  De la part de la princesse morte - Robert Laffont
 1989: Charles Juliet,  L'Année de l'éveil - Éditions P.O.L.
 1990: Yves Beauchemin,  Juliette Pomerleau - Éditions de Fallois.
 1991: Claire Bonnafé, Le Guetteur immobile - Balland
 1992: Nicolas Bréhal, Sonate au clair de Lune - Mercure de France
 1993: Bernard Werber, Le Jour des fourmis - Albin Michel
 1994: Gisèle Pineau, La Grande Drive des esprits - le Serpent à Plumes
 1995: Paulo Coelho, L'Alchimiste (The Alchemist) - Anne Carrière
 1996: Daniel Picouly, Le Champ de personne - Flammarion
 1997: Élisabeth Gille, Un paysage de cendres - Seuil
 1998: Tonino Benacquista, Saga - Gallimard
 1999: Nancy Huston, L'Empreinte de l'ange - Actes Sud 
 2000: Catherine Cusset, Le Problème avec Jane - Gallimard.
 2001: Éric-Emmanuel Schmitt,  L'Évangile selon Pilate - Albin Michel.
 2002: Isabelle Hausser, La Table des enfants - de Fallois
 2003: William Boyd, À livre ouvert (Any Human Heart) - Seuil
 2004: Philippe Claudel,  Les Âmes grises - Stock.
 2005: Philippe Grimbert,  Un secret - Grasset
 2006: Khaled Hosseini,  Les Cerfs-volants de Kaboul (The Kite Runner) - Belfond
 2007: Duong Thu Huong,  Terre des oublis.
 2008: Marie Sizun,  La Femme de l'Allemand - Arléa.
 2009: Claudie Gallay,  Les Déferlantes - Éditions Rouergue.
 2010: Véronique Ovaldé,  Ce que je sais de Vera Candida - Éditions de l'Olivier.
 2011: Kathryn Stockett, La Couleur des sentiments (The Help) - Éditions Jacqueline Chambon / Actes Sud.
 2012: Delphine de Vigan,  Rien ne s'oppose à la nuit - JC Lattès.
 2013: Robert Goolrick,  Arrive un vagabond (Heading Out to Wonderful) - Pocket.
 2014: Laura Kasischke, Esprit d'hiver - Éditions Christian Bourgois.
2015: Anthony Marra for Une constellation de phénomènes vitaux - JC Lattès
2016: Jean-Luc Seigle for Je vous écris dans le noir - Flammarion
2017: Leïla Slimani for Chanson douce - Gallimard
2018: Anna Hope for La salle de bal - Gallimard
2019: (ex-aequo) Adeline Dieudonné for La vraie vie - éditions L’Iconoclaste
2019: (ex-aequo) Jesmyn Ward for Le Chant des revenants - éditions Belfond
2020: Claire Berest for Rien n'est noir - Stock
2021: Colum McCann for Apeirogon - Belfond

Non-fiction (from 1977) 

 1992: Anne Borrel, Alain Senderens and Jean-Bernard Naudin: Proust, la cuisine retrouvée - Le Chêne
 1993: Catherine Audard, Le Respect, de l'estime à la déférence: une question de limite - Autrement
 1994: Alexandra Lapierre, Fanny Stevenson - Robert Laffont
 1995: Henriette Walter, L'Aventure des langues en Occident - Robert Laffont
 1996: Shusha Guppy, Un jardin à Téhéran - Éditions Phébus 
 1997: Serge Toubiana and Antoine de Baecque: François Truffaut - Gallimard
 1998: Evelyne Bloch-Dano: Madame Zola - Grasset
 1999: Laurent Greilsamer: Le Prince foudroyé, la vie de Nicolas de Staël - Fayard 
 2000: Sabine Melchior-Bonnetand, Aude de Tocqueville: Histoire de l'adultère - La Martinère
 2001: François Bizot: Le Portail - La table Ronde.
 2002: Wladyslaw Szpilman: Le Pianiste (The Pianist) - Robert Laffont.
 2003: Jean-Pierre Perrin, Jours de poussière - Choses vues en Afghanistan - La Table ronde
 2004: Fabienne Verdier, Passagère du silence - Albin Michel
 2004: Anna Politkovskaya, Tchétchénie, le déshonneur russe (A Dirty War: A Russian Reporter in Chechnya) - Buchet/Chastel.
 2005: Azar Nafisi, Lire Lolita à Téhéran (Reading Lolita in Tehran) - Plon
 2006: Charles Dantzig, Dictionnaire égoïste de la littérature française - Grasset.
 2007: Dominique Bona, Camille et Paul, la passion Claudel - Grasset.
 2008: Wangari Maathai, Celle qui plante les arbres - Héloïse d'Ormesson.
 2009: Jean-Paul Mari, Sans blessures apparentes - Robert Laffont
 2010: Éric Fottorino,  L'Homme qui m'aimait tout bas - Gallimard.
 2011: Ex-aequo : Benjamin Stora with Tramor Quémeneur,  Algérie 1954-1962 - Éditions Les Arènes / Anne-Marie Revol,  Nos étoiles ont filé - Éditions Stock 
 2012: Helene Cooper,  La Maison de Sugar Beach (The House at Sugar Beach) - .
 2013: Rithy Panh,  L’Élimination.
 2014: Emmanuèle Bernheim, Tout s’est bien passé, Gallimard.
 2015: Pauline Guéna and Guillaume Binet, L'Amérique des écrivains, Éditions Robert Laffont
 2016: Marceline Loridan-Ivens for Et tu n’es pas revenu - Grasset
 2017: Mathias Malzieu for Journal d'un vampire en pyjama - Editions Albin Michel
 2018: Delphine Minoui for Les passeurs de livres de Daraya - Seuil
 2019: Alex Marzano-Lesnevich for L’empreinte - éditions Sonatine
 2020: Vanessa Springora for Consentement - Grasset
 2021: David L. Carlson and Landis Blair for L'accident de chasse - éditions Sonatine

Crime fiction (from 2002) 

 2002: Fred Vargas, Pars vite et reviens tard - Viviane Hamy.
 2003: Harlan Coben, Ne le dis à personne (Tell No One) - Belfond
 2004: Dennis Lehane, Shutter Island - Rivages
 2005: Dominique Sylvain, Passage du désir - Viviane Hamy
 2006: Mo Hayder, Tokyo - Presses de la cité.
 2007: Arnaldur Indriðason, La Femme en vert - Graforþögn.
 2008: Marcus Malte, Garden of Love - Zulma.
 2009: Caryl Férey, Zulu - Gallimard 
 2010: Jesse Kellerman: Les Visages - Sonatine Éditions.
 2011: Lisa Gardner, La Maison d'à côté - Sonatine Éditions
 2012: Jussi Adler-Olsen, Miséricorde - Albin Michel.
 2013: Gillian Flynn, Les Apparences (Gone Girl) - Sonatine.
 2014: Ian Manook, Yeruldelgger - Albin Michel.
 2015: Mechtild Borrmann, Le Violoniste - Éditions du Masque
 2016: Jax Miller, Les Infâmes - Éditions Ombres noires
 2017: Olivier Norek, Surtensions - Michel Lafon
 2018: Eva Dolan, Les chemins de la haine - Éditions Liana Levi
 2019: Franck Bouysse, Né d’aucune femme - Éditions La Manufacture des livres
 2020: Tess Sharpe, Mon Territoire - Sonatine Éditions
 2021: Dolores Redondo, La Face nord du cœur - Gallimard

References

See also
 Elle magazine

French literary awards
1970 establishments in France
Awards established in 1970
First book awards
Mystery and detective fiction awards
Lagardère Active